Charles Benjamin Page (November 4, 1851 – August 13, 1912) was an American lawyer and politician from New York.

Life 
Page was born on November 4, 1851, in Olean, New York, the son of Rufus L. Page and Elizabeth A. Hall.

Page studied in Olean Academy and a private school in New Marlboro, Massachusetts. He moved to New York City in 1870 and began studying law, first under Addison G. Rice and then with Judge Freeman J. Fithian. He was admitted to the bar in 1876. From 1876 to 1886, he associated with Fithian. In 1886, he became the member of the law firm Secor & Page.

In 1895, Page was elected to the New York State Senate as a Republican, representing New York's 17th State Senate district. He served in the Senate in 1896, 1897, and 1898. In 1900, State Comptroller William J. Morgan appointed him tax appraiser. He was also appointed to the New York City Board of Elections that year. He was a delegate to the 1904 and 1908 Republican National Conventions.

Page was a member of the Freemasons.

Page died at home on August 13, 1912. He was buried in Mount View Cemetery in Olean.

References

External links 

 The Political Graveyard
 Charles B. Page at Find a Grave

1851 births
1912 deaths
People from Olean, New York
Politicians from Manhattan
Lawyers from New York City
19th-century American lawyers
20th-century American lawyers
19th-century American politicians
Republican Party New York (state) state senators
American Freemasons
Burials in New York (state)